The band-tailed antwren (Myrmotherula urosticta) is a species of insectivorous bird in the family Thamnophilidae. It is endemic to Brazil. Its natural habitat is subtropical or tropical moist lowland forests. It is threatened by habitat loss.

The band-tailed antwren was described by the English zoologist Philip Sclater in 1857 and given the binomial name Formicivora urosticta.

References

Myrmotherula
Birds of the Atlantic Forest
Endemic birds of Brazil
Birds described in 1857
Taxa named by Philip Sclater
Taxonomy articles created by Polbot